Flink SE is a German on-demand delivery service that delivers everyday items directly to consumers from so-called "dark stores", hyper-local grocery warehouses not accessible to the public.

Flink promises to deliver groceries "in 10 minutes". Deliveries are made by Flink's employees on e-bikes, provided by the company.

Flink is the largest third-party delivery service in Europe, having surpassed Gorillas in 2021. The company said in 2021 that it delivered to up to 10 million customers at over 140 locations in more than 60 cities in Europe.

History 
Flink was founded at the end of 2020 in Berlin by Christoph Cordes, Oliver Merkel and Julian Dames as a start-up. Flink has raised around 750 million US dollars in financing rounds, including from the investor group around DoorDash and from REWE. By the end of 2021, Flink was valued at US$2.1 billion.

References

2020 establishments in Germany